Burakcan Kunt (born 15 May 1992) is a Turkish footballer who plays as a midfielder for 1928 Bucaspor. Kunt made his full debut on 24 April 2010 in a 2. Bundesliga match against SC Paderborn 07.

References

External links

 
 
 Burakcan Kunt at UEFA.com
 

1992 births
Living people
Footballers from Cologne
Turkish footballers
Turkey youth international footballers
Association football midfielders
MSV Duisburg players
2. Bundesliga players
Balıkesirspor footballers
Bucaspor footballers